Darragh Corcoran (born 3 July 2000) is an Irish hurler who plays for Kilkenny Senior Championship club Ballyhale Shamrocks and at inter-county level with the Kilkenny senior hurling team. He usually lines out as a wing-back or a corner-back.

Career

Corcoran first came to hurling prominence at college level with the St. Kieran's College team that won the All-Ireland Colleges Championship title in 2019. He simultaneously enjoyed success with the Ballyhale Shamrocks club, winning an All-Ireland Club Championship title in 2019. Corcoran first lined out at inter-county level as a member of the Kilkenny under-20 team during the 2020 Leinster Under-20 Championship. He was drafted onto the Kilkenny senior hurling team in 2021.

Career statistics

Honours

St. Kieran's College
All-Ireland Colleges Senior Hurling Championship: 2019
Leinster Colleges Senior Hurling Championship: 2019

University of Limerick
Fitzgibbon Cup: 2022

Ballyhale Shamrocks
All-Ireland Senior Club Hurling Championship: 2019, 2020
Leinster Senior Club Hurling Championship: 2018, 2019, 2021
Kilkenny Senior Hurling Championship: 2018, 2019, 2020, 2021

Kilkenny
Leinster Senior Hurling Championship: 2021, 2022

References

2000 births
Living people
Ballyhale Shamrocks hurlers
Kilkenny inter-county hurlers